The Rishikesh–Karnaprayag line is an under-construction railway line, which will run from Yog Nagari Rishikesh railway station in Rishikesh to Karnaprayag. It is Indian Railways' proposed route for the Char Dham Railway to connect the Char Dham pilgrimage of Uttarakhand. The line is also part of an Indian geostrategic initiative to build infrastructure along the India-China border to discourage Chinese expansion. The project is considered to be of national strategic importance and is being tracked on the Central Government’s PRAGATI (Pro Active Governance and Timely Implementation) portal. When ready, it will help improve connectivity to the Char Dham shrines of Yamunotri, Gangotri, Badrinath and Kedarnath in the Garhwal region of the Himalayas in Uttarakhand.

Project
Satpal Maharaj began a survey for the project as Minister of Railways of Uttarakhand in 1996. The project received funding and other authorisations from the government; it was reportedly India's longest tunnel-rail project, which would play a vital role in national security and the welfare of Uttarakhand.

The line will serve pilgrims and local residents, and will be able to rapidly move troops to the India-China border.
The project's foundation stone was scheduled to be laid by United Progressive Alliance chairperson Sonia Gandhi on 9 November 2011.  Alignment of the 126-kilometer-long railway project was completed in 2013, but the project was delayed by political wrangling. The work began finally in 2015 under the leadership of National Democratic Alliance.

Route
The Rishikesh railway station (RKSH) is in the city, and the railway line could not be extended through densely-populated areas. A rail line was built from the Virbhadra station to the new Yog Nagari Rishikesh railway station (YNRK), built in 2020. The ₹16,200 crore project will reduce travel time between Rishikesh and Karnaprayag from 6-7 hours to  hours. It was planned to cross 16 bridges, and 105 km (85 percent) will run through tunnels. A 15.1-km tunnel, reportedly India's longest, will be built between Devprayag and Lachmoli.

According to a letter to the Uttarakhand government from RVNL, stations will include  in Rishikesh, Dehradun district, Srinagar, Tehri, Shivpuri and Byasi in Tehri district, Devprayag and Dungripanth (Dhari devi) in Pauri, Rudraprayag and Gholtir in Rudraprayag district, and Gaucher and Karanprayag in Chamoli district. The line will have 12 stations, 17 tunnels and 35 bridges, and is expected to be completed by 2024-25.

Status
Design contracts for tunnel and bridge construction were awarded in 2019. Italferr, the engineering arm of FS Italiane Group, received the contract for the design and supervision of the 12-km-long section (running almost entirely through tunnels) of the Himalaya Tunnel as part of a joint venture with Swiss firm Lombardi SA. That construction began in 2019.

See also

 Char Dham Railway 
 Doiwala–Dehradun–Uttarkashi–Maneri Gangotri Railway
 Uttarkashi–Palar Yamunotri Railway
 Karnaprayag–Saikot–Sonprayag Kedarnath Railway
 Saikot–Joshimath Badrinath Railway
 Diamond Quadrilateral (railway project)
 Golden Quadrilateral (road project)
 Setu Bharatam (project to eliminate at-grade crossings)

References

Proposed railway lines in India
Rail transport in Uttarakhand
Transport in Rishikesh